Jaswan was a precolonial Indian state centred at Rajpur Jaswan, in modern-day Punjab and Himachal Pradesh, commanded by the Jaswal Rajput clan. It was founded in 1170 AD by Raja Purab Chand, a cadet of the Katoch lineage, ancient royal family of Kangra.

History

Early history
According to legend Jaswan state was founded in 1170 by Raja Purab Chand from the Kangra Royal Family.

Sikh Empire and British Raj
In 1815, Maharaja Ranjit Singh ordered all his available forces to assemble at Sialkot. The raja of Jaswan, Ummed Singh (1800–1849), failed to obey the summons and was fined a sum beyond his means. The raja was forced to relinquish his state to the Sikh emperor, and accepted a jagir of 21 villages and 12,000 Rs per annum. In 1848, he joined the Sikh in an unsuccessful revolt against the British. His palaces were plundered and razed to the ground, and his territory annexed. He was stripped of his title and exiled to Almora, where he died a year later.
In 1877, the jagir in Jaswan, along with several other former properties in Rajpura and Amb, was restored to Ummed's grandson Ran Singh (b. 1833), who also later acquired the jagir of Ramkot in Jammu upon marriage to a granddaughter of Maharaja Gulab Singh.

The titles claimed by the princes, however, were still denied any recognition until Raghunath Singh (b. 1852) was granted the title of raja due to his Katoch lineage and marriages to two of the daughters of Maharaja Ranbir Singh of Jammu and Kashmir. The title could not be passed on through inheritance, and he could not administer his jagir. Raghunath Singh died in 1918, after which Laxman Singh succeeded him.

References

External links
History of Una district

History of Himachal Pradesh
Sikh Empire
Una district
Rajputs